Admiral Sir William Wellclose Davis  (11 October 1901 – 29 October 1987) was a Royal Navy officer who went on to be Vice Chief of the Naval Staff.

Early life and education
Davis was the elder son of Walter Stewart Davis (1856-1946), JP, of the Indian Political Department, and Georgina (died 1925), daughter of David Ross, CIE. The Davis family were landed gentry, of Well Close, Brockworth, Gloucestershire; Davis's middle name came from the family estate. Davis was educated at Summer Fields School in Oxford, the Royal Naval College, Osborne, and the Royal Naval College, Dartmouth.

Naval career
Davis was commissioned into the Royal Navy in 1917, towards the end of the First World War.

He also saw active service in the Second World War, initially as Executive Officer on the battlecruiser . From 1940 he was Deputy Director of Plans at the Admiralty and then, from 1943, returned to sea as Commander of the cruiser HMS Mauritius, in which capacity he was involved in the Sicily landings, the Normandy landings, and the action at Audierne Bay. From November 1944 to February 1946 he was appointed Director of Torpedoes and Mining.

After the War Davis was made Director of Underwater Weapons at the Admiralty and then, from 1948, Chief of Staff to the Commander-in-Chief, Home Fleet. He became Naval Secretary in 1950 and Flag Officer, Second in Command of the Mediterranean Fleet in 1952. He went on to be Vice Chief of the Naval Staff in 1954 and Commander-in-Chief, Home Fleet and Commander-in-Chief, Eastern Atlantic Area in 1958. He was First and Principal Naval Aide-de-camp to the Queen from 1959 to 1960. He retired in 1960.

Family
On 28 April 1934 he married Lady Gertrude Elizabeth Phipps, daughter of Constantine Phipps, 3rd Marquess of Normanby; they went on to have two sons and two daughters. His first cousin was the actor Stringer Davis, husband of Margaret Rutherford.

References

|-

|-

|-

1901 births
1987 deaths
People educated at the Royal Naval College, Osborne
Graduates of Britannia Royal Naval College
People educated at Summer Fields School
Royal Navy admirals
Knights Grand Cross of the Order of the Bath
Companions of the Distinguished Service Order
Lords of the Admiralty
Royal Navy officers of World War I
Royal Navy officers of World War II
Deputy Lieutenants of Gloucestershire
Military personnel of British India